Madson Ferreira dos Santos (born 13 January 1992), simply known as Madson, is a Brazilian footballer who plays as a right back for Athletico Paranaense.

Club career

Bahia

Madson was born in Itaparica, Bahia, and joined Bahia's youth setup in 2010. He made his first team debut on 30 January of the following year, starting in a 2–1 Campeonato Baiano home loss against Fluminense de Feira.

Definitely promoted to the main squad for the 2012 season, Madson featured regularly for the club during the year's state league, and renewed his contract until 2015 on 2 May. However, he subsequently suffered an injury which kept him out for four months, and only made his Série A debut on 23 September by starting in a 3–1 loss at Internacional.

Regularly used in 2013, Madson lost space in the following season, and was loaned to Série B side ABC on 17 May 2014, until the end of the year. At the club he scored his first senior goal, netting the opener in a 2–1 home defeat of Vasco da Gama on 2 September.

Vasco da Gama
In January 2015, Madson agreed to a three-year deal with Vasco, after terminating his contract with Bahia. A regular starter at the club, he suffered relegation in his first season but achieved promotion in his second; in the meantime, he also extended his contract until 2019 in June 2016.

Grêmio
On 12 January 2018, Madson was announced at Grêmio after agreeing to a four-year contract. He was rarely used at his new club, being mainly a backup to veteran Léo Moura.

Athletico Paranaense (loan)
On 7 February 2019, Madson moved to fellow top tier club Athletico Paranaense on a one-year loan deal. He then became a regular starter for the club, and scored his first goal in the main category on 21 July, netting the opener in a 4–0 away routing of CSA.

Santos
On 14 December 2019, Madson signed a three-year contract with Santos, with Victor Ferraz moving in the opposite direction. He made his debut for the club on 7 March, starting in a 3–1 Campeonato Paulista home defeat of Mirassol.

Madson scored his first goal for Peixe on 13 September 2020, netting his team's first in a 2–2 home draw against São Paulo. On 9 November, he and two other teammates tested positive for COVID-19. Despite being a regular starter for the most of his spell, he left on 22 November 2022, as Santos announced that his contract would not be renewed.

Athletico Paranaense return
On 7 January 2023, Madson returned to Athletico on a two-year contract.

International career
In September 2011, Madson was called up to Brazil U23s by manager Ney Franco for the year's Pan American Games, appearing in all three matches as the nation suffered a group stage knockout.

Career statistics

Honours
Bahia
Campeonato Baiano: 2012, 2014

Vasco da Gama
Campeonato Carioca: 2015, 2016
Taça Guanabara: 2016
Taça Rio: 2017

Grêmio
Campeonato Gaúcho: 2018

Athletico Paranaense
J.League Cup / Copa Sudamericana Championship: 2019

References

External links
 

1992 births
Living people
Sportspeople from Bahia
Brazilian footballers
Association football defenders
Campeonato Brasileiro Série A players
Campeonato Brasileiro Série B players
Esporte Clube Bahia players
ABC Futebol Clube players
CR Vasco da Gama players
Grêmio Foot-Ball Porto Alegrense players
Club Athletico Paranaense players
Santos FC players
Footballers at the 2011 Pan American Games
Pan American Games competitors for Brazil